Achnastank (field of the pool/ditch) is a scattered settlement, south east of Ben Rinnes, in the Scottish council area of Moray.

Footnotes

Geography of Moray